INDO LIVE is the third live album by French new wave band  Indochine. It was released in 1997.

Track listing
Disc One
 Ouverture - 1:49	 
 Mire-Live - 4:58 	 
 Unisexe - 5:31
 Les tzars - 4:53
 3 nuits par semaine - 7:10
 La main sur vous - 4:51
 Les silences de Juliette - 5:43
 Kissing My Song - 4:25
 Satellite - 5:26
 Punishment Park - 4:06
 Echo-Ruby - 4:03
 Je n'embrasse pas - 6:05
 Drugstar - 5:26

Disc Two
 Révolution - 5:35
 Des fleurs pour Salinger - 6:24
 Canary Bay - 6:13
 Monte Cristo - 4:56
 Mes regrets - 3e sexe - 6:37
 Tes yeux noirs - 5:23
 L'aventurier - 7:04

External links
 Detailed album information at www.indo-chine.org

References

Indochine (band) albums
1997 live albums